Matobosaurus is a small genus of lizards in the family Gerrhosauridae. The genus is found in southern Africa.

Species
There are two species which are recognized as being valid.
Matobosaurus validus  – common giant plated lizard   
Matobosaurus maltzahni  – western giant plated lizard

References

Matobosaurus
Lizard genera